Enrica Lexie (called Olympic Sky since 2013)  is an Italian Aframax oil-tanker. In 2012, the ship was involved in the shooting of two Indian fisherman in the Laccadive Sea.

History

2008–2012
The Enrica Lexie was built in 2008. She was originally owned by Naples-based Dolphin Tankers whose parent company is Fratelli d'Amato.

2012 shooting incident

On 15 February 2012, the Enrica Lexia was involved in the shooting of two fisherman in the Laccadive Sea off the Indian coast. The tanker was taken to the port of Kochi on 17 February 2012 under escort by the Indian Coast Guard. The ship was allowed to leave 80 days later, on 6 May 2012 after the owners posted a surety bond.

2013–2015
In 2013, she was renamed as Olympic Sky and registered under a Greek flag; vessel management was transferred to Olympic Shipping & Management SA. AIS plots show the tanker operating in the Indian Ocean region.

In 2015, the tanker was registered again in the Marshall Islands.

References

Merchant ships
Merchant ships of Italy
2008 ships